The Maybach Zeppelin was the Maybach company's Repräsentationswagen model from 1929 to 1939.  Named for the company's famous production of Zeppelin engines prior to and during World War I, it was an enormous luxury vehicle which weighed approximately 3000 kg (6600 lb). This weight was so great that German drivers required an additional goods vehicle licence for vehicles over 2½ tons. Along with the Voisin, and behind the Daimler Double Six, this was Europe's joint second luxury V12 car in production.

DS7
The DS7 (Doppel Sechs 7) version featured a 7.0 L (6,971 cc) V12 engine that produced  at 2,800 rpm. It was available from 1929 to 1930. Work began in 1928 on a model simply called the "Maybach 12" which went on sale in 1929. In 1930 it was re-branded as the DS7 and the "Zeppelin" badge appeared on a bar between the headlamps; although adopted universally as the "Maybach Zeppelin", this was never the car's official model.

Karl Maybach's engine was a long-stroke design, with dimensions of 86×100 mm. The crankshaft had eight main bearings, one being a smaller outrigger at the rear, supporting the camshaft drive gears. In a novel feature for reduced noise, these were made of Novotext, a resin-impregnated fibre composite. A further novel feature was the use of enlarged four-bolt main bearing caps on three of the bearings.

DS8
Supplementing the DS7 from 1930 was the DS8 (Doppelganger). It sported an 8.0 L (7978 cc, 487 cubic inches) V12 which made  at a fairly low 3200 rpm, putting the DS8 among the most powerful production cars in the world at the time.

In August 2012, a 1938 DS8 Roadster sold for €1.3 million at auction, fitted with a rare Variorex eight-speed gearbox (both the first 8-speed and first 8-speed manual gearbox) with a vacuum shift and is thought to be one of only 100 built.

Revival
When Maybach was revived as a brand by DaimlerChrysler, old Maybachs, particularly the opulent 8-litre Zeppelin, saw new popularity as part of a marketing effort which sought to link the current brand with the heritage of the original car company.  This resurrecting of the classic name resulted in increased visibility and popularity of well-restored or preserved Maybachs.

Gallery

References

Zeppelin
Full-size vehicles
Luxury vehicles
Flagship vehicles
Sedans
Convertibles
Cars introduced in 1928
Rear-wheel-drive vehicles